The Uppsala Programme for Holocaust and Genocide Studies is an academic institute conducting research in Holocaust and genocide studies. It is a part of the Centre for Multiethnic Research of the Faculty of Philosophy and History at Uppsala University. 
As part of its national information campaign focusing on the Holocaust and genocide, the Swedish government finances the Uppsala Programme for Holocaust and Genocide Studies. Housed within the Centre for Multiethnic Research of the Faculty of History and Philosophy, the Programme commenced its research and educational activities in 1998. The Programme is guided by a three-part mandate: research and publication, documentation, and continuing education, primarily of teachers. Additional funding is provided by the Uppsala University Rector's office. Studies are published by the programme in international journals as well as in publications of the university like Studia Multiethnica Upsaliensia, Uppsala Multiethnic Papers and Acta Sueco-Polonica.

The programme is cooperating with academic institutions through research and pedagogical exchange both within Sweden and with universities in Australia, Germany, France, Israel, Canada, Poland, the United Kingdom and the United States.

References

External links 
Official Page 
Uppsala University

Uppsala University
Holocaust studies
Genocide education
Genocide research and prevention organisations